Abhijñā (Pali pronunciation: abhiññā;  mngon shes) is a Buddhist term generally translated as "direct knowledge", "higher knowledge" or "supernormal knowledge." In Buddhism, such special knowledge is obtained through virtuous living and meditation. The attainment of the four jhanas, or meditative absorptions, are considered a prerequisite for their attainment. In terms of specifically enumerated knowledges, these include mundane extra-sensory abilities (such as seeing past lives and various supranormal powers like levitation) as well as the supramundane, meaning the extinction of all mental intoxicants (āsava).

Pali literature 
In Pali literature, abhiññā refers to both the direct apprehension of dhamma (translated below as "states" and "qualities") as well as to specialized super-normal capabilities.

Direct knowing of dhamma
In SN 45.159, the Buddha describes "higher knowledge" (abhiññā) as a corollary to the pursuit of the Noble Eightfold Path:

Such direct knowledge, according to the Buddha, is obscured by desire and passion (chanda-rāga):

Enumerations of special knowledges
In the Pali Canon, the higher knowledges are often enumerated in a group of six or of three types of knowledge.

The six types of higher knowledges (chalabhiññā) are:
 "Higher powers" (iddhi-vidhā), such as walking on water and through walls;
 "Divine ear" (dibba-sota), that is, clairaudience;
 "Mind-penetrating knowledge" (ceto-pariya-ñāa), that is, telepathy;
 "Remember one's former abodes" (pubbe-nivāsanussati), causal memory, that is, recalling one's own past lives;
 "Divine eye" (dibba-cakkhu), that is, knowing others' karmic destinations; and,
 "Extinction of mental intoxicants" (āsavakkhaya), upon which arahantship follows.

The attainment of these six higher powers is mentioned in a number of discourses, most famously the "Fruits of Contemplative Life Discourse" (DN 2). The attainment of the four jhanas is considered to be a prerequisite for the attainment of the higher powers. The sixth type is the ultimate goal of Buddhism, which is the end of all suffering and destruction of all ignorance. According to the Buddha, indulgence in the abhiññās should be avoided, as they can distract from the ultimate goal of Enlightenment.

Similarly, the three knowledges or wisdoms ( or ) are:
 "Remember one's former abodes" (pubbe-nivāsanussati);
 "Divine eye" (dibba-cakkhu); and,
 "Extinction of mental intoxicants" (āsavakkhaya).

The three knowledges are mentioned in numerous discourses including the Maha-Saccaka Sutta (MN 36) in which the Buddha describes obtaining each of these three knowledges on the first, second and third watches respectively of the night of his enlightenment. These forms of knowledge typically are listed as arising after the attainment of the fourth jhana.

While such powers are considered to be indicative of spiritual progress, Buddhism cautions against their indulgence or exhibition since such could divert one from the true path of obtaining suffering's release.

Parallels in other cultures 
The first five types of Abhijna, are similar to the siddhis of yoga in Hinduism, mentioned in the Bhagavata Purana and by Patanjali:

 Knowing the past, present and future;
 Tolerance of heat, cold and other dualities;
 Knowing the minds of others;
 Checking the influence of fire, sun, water, poison, and so on;
 Remaining unconquered by others.

See also

 Iddhi
 Miracles of Gautama Buddha
 Prajñā
 Nibbana, obtain cessation of suffering
 Samaññaphala Sutta
 Siddhi
 Vibhuti

References

Sources 

 "Abhijna" (2007). In Encyclopædia Britannica. Retrieved 2007-05-18 from Encyclopædia Britannica Online: https://www.britannica.com/eb/article-9003346.
 "Abhinna" (2007). In Orientalia: Eastern Philosophy, Religion and Culture. Retrieved 2007-05-18 from Orientalia: https://web.archive.org/web/20050506001255/http://orientalia.org/dictionary-Buddhist_Dictionary-definition22811-abhinna.html.
 Bodhi, Bhikkhu (trans.) (2000). The Connected Discourses of the Buddha: A Translation of the Samyutta Nikaya. Boston: Wisdom Publications. .
 Rhys Davids, T.W. & William Stede (eds.) (1921-5). "" in The Pali Text Society’s Pali–English Dictionary. Chipstead: Pali Text Society. Retrieved 2007-05-18 from Digital Dictionaries of South Asia: http://dsal.uchicago.edu/cgi-bin/philologic/getobject.pl?c.0:1:1696.pali.
 
 Thanissaro Bhikkhu (trans.) (1994). Upakkilesa Samyutta: Defilements (SN 27.1-10). Retrieved 2008-07-17 from "Access to Insight" at http://www.accesstoinsight.org/tipitaka/sn/sn27/sn27.001-010.than.html.
 Thanissaro Bhikkhu (trans.) (1997). Samaññaphala Sutta: The Fruits of the Contemplative Life (DN 2). Retrieved 2007-05-18 from: http://www.accesstoinsight.org/tipitaka/dn/dn.02.0.than.html.
 Thanissaro Bhikkhu (trans.) (1998). Maha-Saccaka Sutta: The Longer Discourse to Saccaka (excerpt) (MN 36). Retrieved 2007-05-19 from: https://web.archive.org/web/20080801091439/http://www.accesstoinsight.org/tipitaka/mn/mn.036x.than.html.
 Walshe, Maurice O'C. (1985). Samyutta Nikaya: An Anthology (Part III) (Wheel Nos. 318-21). Kandy: Buddhist Publication Society. Retrieved 2008-07-17 from "Access to Insight" (transcribed 2007) at http://www.accesstoinsight.org/lib/authors/walshe/wheel318.html.

External links

Buddhist philosophical concepts
Buddhist miracles
Psychic powers